Mount Takahe is a  snow-covered shield volcano in Marie Byrd Land, Antarctica,  from the Amundsen Sea. Most of the volcano is formed by trachytic lava flows, but hyaloclastite is also found. Snow, ice, and glaciers cover most of Mount Takahe. It is part of the West Antarctic Rift System along with eighteen other known volcanoes.

The volcano was active in the Quaternary period, from 2.5 million years ago to the present. Radiometric dating has yielded ages of up to 300,000years for its rocks, and it reached its present height about 200,000years ago. Several tephra layers encountered in ice cores at Mount Waesche and Byrd Station have been attributed to Mount Takahe, although some of them were later linked to eruptions of Mount Berlin instead. The tephra layers were formed by explosive or phreatomagmatic eruptions. Major eruptions took place around 17,700years ago—possibly forming an ozone hole over Antarctica—and in the early Holocene. Mount Takahe's last eruption occurred about 7,600 years ago, and there is no present-day activity.

Geography and geomorphology 
Mount Takahe is at the Bakutis Coast, eastern Marie Byrd Land, Antarctica.

No major air routes or supply roads to Antarctic stations pass close to the volcano, and some parts of the edifice are accessible only by helicopter. The name of the volcano refers to the takahē, a flightless nearly extinct bird from New Zealand; members of the 1957–1958 Marie Byrd Land Traverse party nicknamed an aircraft that had resupplied them "takahe". Mount Takahe was first visited in 1957–1958 and again in 1968, 1984-1985 and 1998-1999.

A lava dome may crop out inside the caldera. Radial fissure vents are found around the volcano, and vents also occur around the caldera rim. There are at least three parasitic vents with basaltic composition on its lower flanks, with three cinder cones found on the western and southern slopes. One of these cinder cones has been described as a subdued  vent. The Jaron Cliffs are found on the southern slope.

The volcano is largely uneroded and thus exposures of its internal structure that would allow reconstructing its history are rare. The interior structure of the volcano is unknown. Based on these outcrops, lava flows with a thickness of  appear to be widespread on Mount Takahe, while pyroclastic rocks such as deposits of Strombolian eruptions, lapilli tuffs and lahar deposits are less common. Occurrences of pyroclastic rocks at the summit have been correlated with tephra deposits elsewhere in Antarctica. Additional, obsidian-bearing and recently erupted lava bomb-and-block units crop out in the caldera rim, at Bucher Rim. Tuyas reportedly exist at Mount Takahe.

Glaciation 
A tributary of the Thwaites Glacier passes close to Mount Takahe. There are two small glaciers on the volcano itself, on the southwestern and northern flanks. They are eroding eruption products from the summit area, and moraines have been mapped both on the western flank and in the summit caldera. Glacial erosion is not pronounced, only a few corries cut into the lower slopes. The ice cover on the mountain includes both snow-covered and ice-covered areas, with sastrugi and other wind-roughened surfaces. The polar environment is cold and dry, which slows weathering processes. Air temperatures recorded at Mount Takahe are usually below freezing.

Some rock units at the foot of the volcano were emplaced underneath ice or water and feature hyaloclastite and pillow lavas. Some of these units, such as Gill Bluff, Möll Spur and Stauffer Bluff, are "hydrovolcanic deltas" comparable to lava deltas which formed when lava flows from Mount Takahe or parasitic vents entered the ice, generating meltwater lakes surrounding the lavas. They crop out at the base of the volcano and are well preserved. Ice elevation was not stable during the emplacement of these deltas, and meltwater drained away, leading to the formation of diverse structures within the hyaloclastite deltas. The deltas may have formed during ice highstands 66,000 and 22,000–15,000years ago.

Geology 
The West Antarctic Rift System is a basin and range province similar to the Great Basin in North America; it cuts across Antarctica from the Ross Sea to the Bellingshausen Sea. The Rift became active during the Mesozoic. Owing to thick ice cover it is not clear whether it is currently active, and there is no seismic activity. Most of the Rift lies below sea level. To the south it is flanked by the Transantarctic Mountains and to the north by the volcanic province of Marie Byrd Land. Volcanic activity in Marie Byrd Land commenced about 34million years ago, but high activity began 14million years ago. A major uplifted dome,  in width, is centred on the Amundsen Sea coast and is associated with the Rift.

About 18 central volcanoes were active in Marie Byrd Land from the Miocene to the Holocene. Among the volcanic areas in Marie Byrd Land are the Flood Range with Mount Berlin, the Ames Range, the Executive Committee Range with Mount Sidley and Mount Waesche, the Crary Mountains, Toney Mountain, Mount Takahe and Mount Murphy. These volcanoes mainly occur in groups or chains, but there also are isolated edifices. Mount Takahe is located in the eastern Marie Byrd Land volcanic province and with an estimated volume of  could be the largest of the Marie Byrd Land volcanoes, comparable to Mount Kilimanjaro in Africa.

Most of these volcanoes are large, capped off by a summit caldera and appear to have begun as fast-growing shield volcanoes. Later, calderas formed. Eventually, late in the history of the volcanoes parasitic vents were active. The volcanoes are all surmounted by rocks composed of trachyte, phonolite, pantellerite, or comendite. Their activity has been attributed either to the reactivation of crustal structures or to the presence of a mantle plume. The volcanoes rise from a Paleozoic basement.

Mount Takahe may feature a large magma chamber and a heat flow anomaly underneath the ice has been found at the volcano. A magnetic anomaly has also been linked to the mountain.

Composition 
Trachyte is the most common rock on Mount Takahe, phonolite being less common. Basanite, hawaiite, and mugearite are uncommon, but the occurrence of benmoreite and pantellerite has been reported, and some rocks have been classified as andesites. Hawaiite occurs exclusively in the older outcrops, basanite only in parasitic vents and mugearite only on the lower sector of the volcano. Despite this, most of the volcano is believed to consist of mafic rocks with only about 10–15% of felsic rocks, as the upper visible portion of the volcano could be resting on a much larger buried base. The parasitic vents probably make up less than 1% of the edifice. Ice-lava interactions produced hyaloclastite, palagonite and sideromelane. No major changes in magma chemistry occurred during the last 40,000years but some variation has been recorded.

All these rocks appear to have a common origin and define an alkaline–peralkaline suite. Phenocrysts include mainly plagioclase, with less common olivine and titanomagnetite; apatite has been reported as well. The magmas appear to have formed through fractional crystallization at varying pressures, and ultimately came from the lithosphere at  depth, that was affected by subduction processes over 85million years ago.

Eruption history 
The volcano was active in the late Quaternary. Radiometric results reported in 1988 include ages of less than 360,000years for rocks in the caldera rim and of less than 240,000years for volcanic rocks on the flanks. In his 1990 book Volcanoes of the Antarctic Plate and Southern Oceans LeMasurier gave 310,000±90,000years old as the oldest date for samples tested, citing unpublished K-Ar dates, but in a 2016 review of dates for Mount Takahe LeMasurier reported that none were older than 192,000years. A 2013 paper also by LeMasurier reported maximum ages of 192,000years for caldera rim rocks and of 66,000years for lower flank rocks. The entire volcano may have formed in less than 400,000years or even less than 200,000years, which would imply a fast growth of the edifice. Rocks aged 192,000±6,300years old are found at the summit caldera, implying that the volcano had reached its present-day height by then.

Early research indicated that most of Mount Takahe formed underneath the ice, but more detailed field studies concluded that most of the volcano developed above the ice surface. The ice surface has fluctuated over the life of Mount Takahe with an increased thickness during marine isotope stages 4 and 2, explaining why units originally emplaced under ice or water now lie above the ice surface and alternate with lava flow deposits. These elevated deposits were emplaced about 29,000–12,000years ago while the lava delta-like deposits are between about 70,000and 15,000years old. After it grew out of the ice, Mount Takahe increased in size through the emission of lava flows with occasional pyroclastic eruptions. Outcrops in the summit region indicate that most eruptions were magmatic, but some hydromagmatic activity occurred. Cinder cones and tuff cones formed during the late stage of activity.

Tephra in ice cores 
Tephra layers in ice cores drilled at Byrd Station have been attributed to Mount Takahe. The volcano reaches an altitude high enough that tephras erupted from it can readily penetrate the tropopause and spread over Antarctica through the stratosphere. The occurrence of several volcanic eruptions in the region about 30,000years ago has been suggested to have caused a cooling of the climate of Antarctica, but it is also possible that the growth of the ice sheets at that time squeezed magma chambers at Mount Takahe and thus induced an increase of the eruptive activity.

Assuming that most tephra layers at Byrd come from Mount Takahe, it has been inferred that the volcano was very active between 60,000 and 7,500 years ago, with nine eruptive periods and two pulses between 60,000–57,000and 40,000–14,000years ago. In the latter part of the latter period hydrovolcanic eruptions became dominant at Mount Takahe, with a maximum around the time when the Wisconsin glaciation ended. It is possible that between 18,000 and 15,000years ago, either a crater lake formed in the caldera or the vents were buried by snow and ice. The caldera itself might have formed between 20,000 and 15,000years ago, probably not through a large explosive eruption.

It cannot be entirely ruled out that Byrd Station tephras originate at other volcanoes of Marie Byrd Land such as Mount Berlin. In particular, tephra layers between 30,000and 20,000years ago have been attributed to the latter volcano.

Tephra layers from Mount Takahe have also been found at Dome C, Dome F, Mount Takahe itself, Mount Waesche, Siple Dome and elsewhere in Antarctica. Apart from ice cores, tephras attributed to Mount Takahe have been found in sediment cores taken from the sea. Volcanic eruptions at Mount Takahe lack the pyroclastic flow deposits observed in other large explosive eruptions. The thickness of the Byrd ice core tephras attributed to Mount Takahe suggested that the eruptions were not large, but later research has indicated that large Plinian eruptions also occurred.

A series of eruptions about 200 years long took place at Mount Takahe 17,700years ago. These eruptions have been recorded from ice cores at the WAIS Divide and at Taylor Glacier in the McMurdo Dry Valleys, where they constrain estimates of the rate of deglaciation. These eruptions released a large quantity of halogens into the stratosphere, which together with the cold and dry climate conditions of the last glacial maximum would presumably have led to massive ozone destruction and the formation of an ozone hole. Bromine and sulfur isotope data indicate that the amount of UV radiation in the atmosphere did increase at that time in Antarctica. As is the case with the present-day ozone hole, the ozone hole created by the Takahe eruptions might have altered the Antarctic climate and sped up deglaciation, which was accelerating at that time, but later research has determined that the warming was most likely not volcanically forced.

Holocene and recent activity 
Activity waned after this point, two hydromagmatic eruptions being recorded 13,000and 9,000years ago and a magmatic eruption 7,500years ago. This last eruption is also known from the Byrd ice core and may correspond to an eruption 8,200±5,400years ago recorded at Mount Waesche and the Takahe edifice and to two 6217 and 6231 BC tephra layers at Siple Dome. Tephra from a 8,200before present eruption has been recorded at Siple Dome and Mount Waesche. A 7,900before present eruption at Mount Takahe is one of the strongest eruptions at Siple Dome and Byrd Station of the last 10,000years. Another eruption reported by the Global Volcanism Program may have occurred in 7050 BC. At Siple Dome, a further eruption between 10,700 and 5,600years ago is recorded and one tephra layer around 1783 BC (accompanied by increased sulfate concentrations in ice) might also come from Mount Takahe. Glass shards at Law Dome emplaced in 1552 and 1623 AD may come from this volcano as well.

The Global Volcanism Program reports 5550 BC as the date of the most recent eruption, and the volcano is currently considered dormant. There is no evidence of fumarolic activity or warm ground, unlike at Mount Berlin, which is the other young volcano of Marie Byrd Land. Seismic activity recorded at  depth around the volcano may be linked to its activity. Mount Takahe has been prospected for the possibility of obtaining geothermal energy.

See also
 List of Ultras of Antarctica
 List of volcanoes in Antarctica

Explanatory notes

References

Citations

Sources

External links
 

Polygenetic shield volcanoes
Volcanoes of Marie Byrd Land
Potentially active volcanoes
Calderas of Antarctica
Pleistocene shield volcanoes
Holocene shield volcanoes